Dixonius taoi is a species of lizard in the family Gekkonidae. The species is endemic to Phú Quý Island in southern Vietnam.

Etymology
The specific name, taoi, is in honor of Vietnamese herpetologist Tao Thien Nguyen.

Habitat
The preferred natural habitat of D. taoi is forest, at altitudes near sea level.

Description

Reproduction
The mode of reproduction of D. taoi is unknown.

References

Further reading
Botov A, Phung TM, Nguyen QT, Bauer AM, Brennan IG, Ziegler T (2015). "A new species of Dixonius (Squamata: Gekkonidae) from Phu Quy Island, Vietnam". Zootaxa 4040 (1): 048–058. (Dixonius taoi, new species).

Dixonius
Reptiles described in 2015